The Royal Bahrain Naval Force (RBNF) (previously known as Bahrain Defense Force, Naval Branch) is the maritime branch of the Bahrain Defence Force. The current Commander of the Royal Bahrain Naval Force is Rear Admiral Mohammed Yousif al-Asam. The navy consists of 7 combat vessels, 31 patrol craft, 10 landing ships and over 700 personnel. The fleet is based at Mina Salman Naval Base and has a flight wing which can operate off the corvettes, consisting of two MBB BO-105 helicopters. The flagship of the RBNF is the vessel RBNS Sabha, an American-built missile frigate given to the state as a gift in 1996.

Fleet

Ships

Aircraft

Missiles & Torpedoes

Future
Sep. 8, 2017 - The US State Department has made a determination approving a possible Foreign Military Sale to Bahrain for two 35 Meter Fast Patrol Boats.  The estimated cost is $60.25 million. Now in service.

In 2019, Bahrain has purchased another frigate from the US, the USS Robert G. Bradley (FFG-49) which will join the fleet after completion of current refurbishment works.

Bahrain has ordered 6 Vigor RB-M Fast Interceptor boats. 3+ now in service.

Bahrain Eyes French-Origin Egypt-Built Gowind Corvettes

Bases 

 Mina Salman Naval Base is a facility currently shared with the United States Navy and is used as a ship and submarine logistic support base  for the entire US Fifth Fleet. It was opened in the 1980s as cargo facility and is now solely used as a naval port.
 Manama Naval Base is another key US Navy installation and formerly home to HMS Juffair. It is not used by RBNF.
 RBNF also operates a shipyard that is shared with several other neighbouring countries.

Commanders 
Rear Admiral Mohamed bin Yousif Al-Asam

See also 
 Naval Support Activity Bahrain

References

External links 

 Haze Gray Bahrain Navy
 INSS Bahrain Navy
 掲示板 インターネット日韓文化交流 - KJCLUB - KJLAND: Photos of surface vessels of the RBNF 

 
Military of Bahrain
Bahrain
Bahrain Defence Force